PRK Productions is an Indian film production company founded by Puneeth Rajkumar and managed by his wife, Ashwini Puneeth Rajkumar.

History 
PRK Productions was founded on 20 July 2017. The production house made its feature film debut with Kavaludaari (2019), a neo-noir thriller film starring Rishi and Anant Nag. The studio's next film was Mayabazar 2016 (2020), which featured an ensemble cast of Raj B. Shetty, Vasishta N. Simha, and Prakash Raj. Due to the COVID-19 pandemic, the production house's next two ventures, Law and French Biriyani, were directly released on Amazon Prime Video in 2020. Law marked the film debut of Ragini, Prajwal Devaraj's wife. French Biriyani stars Danish Sait and Sal Yusuf and marks the film debut of TikToker Disha Madan.

Filmography

References 

Film production companies based in Bangalore
Indian film studios
Film production companies of Karnataka